The Ormond Yacht Club building is a historic site in Ormond Beach, Florida, United States. The organization was chartered on February 10, 1910, and its constitution stated, "The object of the club shall be to increase the sociability and general up-building of the town of Ormond and to promote boating in its broadest sense,"

It is located at 63 North Beach Street, and was built in 1910 on the Halifax River. The structure is supported by a foundation of concrete piers with wooden posts. A 147-foot walkway connects the structure to the river's western shore. It is a 2-story frame vernacular wooden structure with 1,734 square feet. Its hip roof has a medium pitch (almost pyramidal in appearance). A walkway and boathouse once extended from the clubhouse further into the Halifax River, but these structures were destroyed by a storm and never rebuilt.

Design 
The Ormond Yacht Club was designed by architect, Sumner Hale Gove in the Frame Vernacular style.

National Register of Historic Places
On April 19, 2005, it was added to the U.S. National Register of Historic Places.

References

External links

 Volusia County listings at National Register of Historic Places
 Ormond Yacht Club website.

Gallery

National Register of Historic Places in Volusia County, Florida
Ormond Beach, Florida